Santana Row (abbreviated as SR or The Row) is a residential and commercial district of West San Jose in San Jose, California. Santana Row is intersected by Stevens Creek Boulevard, a major thoroughfare, and close to local landmarks like Westfield Valley Fair and the Winchester Mystery House.

History
Santana Row derives its name from Frank M. Santana, who served on San Jose's planning commission in the 1950s, who is also the namesake for the area's Frank M. Santana Park. The site was previously a Town and Country Village shopping center.

On August 19, 2002, during construction, the largest building at Santana Row (Building 7, "Santana Heights") caught fire. The fire was reported at 3:36 p.m. Embers caused at least 15 smaller fires nearby, and a nearby apartment complex had 39 units destroyed, resulting in 132 people losing their homes. The main fire spread to five alarms, while the secondary fires required six alarms. It was the largest structure fire in San Jose's history, with damage estimated at $129 million.

The 42-acre "village within a city" was developed as a luxury, mixed residential and shopping district between 2001-2002, for a cost of $450 million and was at the time regarded as "the most ambitious project of its kind in the United States". In 2010, it was called "an arguably successful mixed-use development".

Santana Row continued to expand in 2016.  A population of 24,196 live within a one-mile radius of Santana Row.

Lifestyle

Shopping
Santana Row offers a mix of brand name shops, local boutiques, restaurants, 36 establishments serving food, nine spas and salons, a theater, and a hotel.

Several large-scale anchor retailers line the property's frontage on Stevens Creek Boulevard, including Crate & Barrel, The Container Store, and Best Buy. Major tenants within the center include H&M, Tesla, Nike, lululemon, and Madewell.

Awards
The collaborative design effort earned Santana Row two major awards, the CELSOC Engineering Excellence Award in 2004, and Builder Magazines Project of the Year in 2003.

The design team, including SB Architects, BAR Architects, Steinberg Architects and landscape architects The SWA Group and April Philips Design Works, worked on behalf of the project developers, Federal Realty Investment Trust.

Economy
Santana Row is home to a small tech hub of companies, including Splunk, NetApp, BlueJeans, Experian, Federal Realty Investment Trust, and AvalonBay Communities, among others.

Parks 
Valencia Park
Santana Row Park
Frank M. Santana Park

References

External links

Official Website
Walking Tour

Buildings and structures in San Jose, California
Shopping malls in the San Francisco Bay Area
Shopping malls in Santa Clara County, California
Mixed-use developments in California
Shopping malls established in 2003